Oleksandr Mykolayovych Pernatskyi (born 17 July 1995) is a Ukrainian professional footballer who plays as a centre-back for Czech club Viktoria Otrokovice.

References

External links
 Profile on Podillya Khmelnytskyi official website
 Profile on Moravian-Silesian Football League official website
 

1995 births
Living people
Footballers from Kyiv
Ukrainian footballers
Association football defenders
FC Arsenal Kyiv players
SC Tavriya Simferopol players
FC Vorskla Poltava players
FC Hirnyk-Sport Horishni Plavni players
1. SK Prostějov players
MFK Vyškov players
FC Podillya Khmelnytskyi players
FC Viktoria Otrokovice players
Ukrainian First League players
Ukrainian Second League players
Czech National Football League players
Moravian-Silesian Football League players
Ukrainian expatriate sportspeople in the Czech Republic
Ukrainian expatriate footballers
Expatriate footballers in the Czech Republic